Monique Albuquerque (born 11 September 1991) is a Brazilian former professional tennis player.

A right-handed player from Porto Alegre, Albuquerque represented the Brazil Cup team in a total of four ties, across 2009 and 2010. All of her appearances were in the doubles rubbers partnering Roxane Vaisemberg, with the pair winning three of their four matches together. She played on the professional tour until 2011, securing six ITF doubles titles.

From 2013 to 2015, she played varsity tennis for the Miami Hurricanes at the University of Miami.

ITF finals

Doubles: 14 (6–8)

References

External links
 
 
 

1991 births
Living people
Brazilian female tennis players
Sportspeople from Porto Alegre
Miami Hurricanes women's tennis players
21st-century Brazilian women